Goulburn Ovens Institute of TAFE, also known as GOTAFE, GOTAFE is the largest vocational education provider in regional Victoria. Offering over 130 courses across eight campuses, GOTAFE services 11 local government areas with an estimated resident population of over 240,000 people. We service more than 9,000 students per year on average, employ over 500 staff, and we are an intrinsic part of the communities that we serve.

Campuses
The Institute has number of campuses in towns including Shepparton, Wangaratta, Seymour, Benalla, Wallan and have most recently added a Mobile Campus.

Benalla
In 2004 Lynne Kosky, the then Minister for Education, opened the Benalla Performing Arts and Convention Centre at the Goulburn Ovens Institute of TAFE. Kosky said "This campus will facilitate the delivery of approximately 226,000 student contact hours to more than 1100 students each year," The $4.2 million campus upgrade was funded jointly by the State Government, Benalla Rural City Council and the Goulburn Ovens Institute of TAFE.

Shepparton
There are three campuses in Shepparton. The Fryers Street Campus houses the Institute's Administration and a large number of teaching Departments such as Business and IT, Beauty, Community Services, Education, Nursing and Hospitality.  Archer Street Campus which houses Building & Construction, Furniture Making, Art & Design, Carpentry, Joinery, and associated Construction Trades. On the outskirts of Shepparton is the William Orr campus: a 120 hectare property which has a diverse range of classes being offered in areas of Agriculture, Horticulture, Plumbing, Automotive, Dairy Farming and recently Cyber Security. Modern farming equipment and facilities such as skills training options from Tractors with Front End loaders, Quadbikes and the popular Side by Side utility vehicles to Chainsaws and Chemical courses. The campus also has well equipped Plumbing and Automotive Workshops and Horticultural facilities including a large greenhouse. An exciting upgrade is currently underway across Agriculture, Horticulture, Automotive and Plumbing.

Seymour
The Seymour campus was opened in 1998 and offers a variety of courses including Nursing and Trades. The campus has recently undergone a significant transformation, meaning students now have access to modern, innovative spaces when studying.

Wangaratta
There are two campuses in Wangaratta. The Docker street campus in Wangaratta offers a range of specialist training facilities, extensive library, Café and support services, and courses in the areas of as Art & Design, Automotive, Beauty, Community Services, Engineering, Education, Nursing, Plumbing, Building and Construction - just to name a few.  The Tone Rd campus on the outskirts of Wangaratta is the home for the Equine, Animal Sciences, Agriculture, Horticulture and Viticulture Departments and most recently Business and Information Technology. This campus is referred to as the Wangaratta Regional Study Centre Campus, a world class facility catering to the needs of the Animal Science, Equine, Agriculture, Horticulture and Viticulture industries. The Centre provides a range of modern facilities including lecture theatres and tutorial rooms, interactive video teaching and information technology facilities, a state of the art science laboratory and a student learning commons. Computer labs accommodating both Charles Sturt University (CSU) and GOTAFE students allow learners to access information in the one virtual environment.

Wallan
Located on level one, 57-59 High Street Wallan, the campus is a partnership between GOTAFE and La Trobe University. The campus offers a Digitally connected learning space, Relaxed communal kitchen facility and is a Flexible purpose built campus.

Mobile Campus
The GOTAFE Mobile Campus will connect with communities that don’t have the opportunity to easily engage with training, career and TAFE services. Working in partnership with local government and tapping into job active networks and financial support services, the Mobile Campus will take a community centred and solutions-based approach to delivering services that enhances your opportunities across regional Victoria.

History
In October 1996 the Goulburn Valley Institute of TAFE and the Wangaratta Institute of TAFE were combined to form the Goulburn Ovens Institute of TAFE, later known as "GOTAFE".

The Institute's antecedents go back to the Wangaratta Technical School (1928) and Shepparton Technical College (1953).

In 1972 the Wangaratta Technical School became the Wangaratta Technical College, followed by Wangarrata College of TAFE in 1981, and Wangarrata Institute of TAFE in 1995.

The Shepparton Technical College became the Shepparton College of TAFE in 1981, then the Goulburn Valley College of TAFE in 1986, Goulburn Valley Community College in 1992, and Goulburn Valley Institute of TAFE in 1995.

Dookie College (1886) was for a time a joint campus of the TAFE and the University of Melbourne.

Awards
 2007 – gold medal was won for "Wyndham Gold", a washed rind cheese, at South Australia's Specialty Cheese Show, CheeseFest 07.
 2006 – ATMA Marketer/Business Developer of the Year Award at the Australian TAFE Marketing Association (ATMA)

References

External links
 Goulburn Ovens Institute of TAFE website
 GOTAFE Library

Education in Victoria (Australia)